Greatest Hits is the first compilation album by punk rock band Bomb Factory.  It was released in November 2007 on Monstar Records/CCRE, and contains 16 songs. The album artwork was produced by New York-based illustrator Joe Simko. A year later, Bomb Factory signed with American N2O Records and re-released the album under the title Moshing Through Tokyo on August 18, 2008, making it their first release in the United States and the second in Europe after Discord. It was also their first release on iTunes. The same tracks and cover art were included from Greatest Hits with only minor changes to the design.

Track listing

References

External links
Bomb Factory's official website

Bomb Factory (band) albums
2007 greatest hits albums